The 1972–73 North Carolina Tar Heels men's basketball team represented the University of North Carolina at Chapel Hill during the 1972–73 men's college basketball season.

Schedule

|-
!colspan=6 style=|ACC Tournament

|-
!colspan=6 style=|National Invitation Tournament

References

North Carolina Tar Heels men's basketball seasons
North Carolina
North Carolina
Tar
Tar